Ali Abdallah Abu-Eshrein Darasha (born 6 December 1989) is a Sudanese footballer who plays as a goalkeeper for Al-Hilal Omdurman and the Sudan national football team.

References 

1989 births
Living people
Sudanese footballers
Sudan international footballers
Association football goalkeepers
Al-Hilal Club (Omdurman) players
Sudan Premier League players
2021 Africa Cup of Nations players
Sudan A' international footballers
2022 African Nations Championship players